Marcusenius thomasi is a species of ray-finned fish in the family Mormyridae. It is found in Guinea, Guinea-Bassau, Liberia, and Sierre Leone. Its natural habitats are rivers, intermittent rivers, and freshwater lakes. It is threatened by Mining and deforestation.

Etymology
The fish is named in honor of anthropologist Northcote W. Thomas (1868-1936), who collected the type specimen.

References

Marcusenius
Taxa named by George Albert Boulenger
Fish described in 1916